The European College of Parma Foundation is a higher education institution which provides academic training for young European graduates in the field of European Union law, economics and politics. The educational programme offered by the European College of Parma is a comprehensive, interdisciplinary academic curriculum covering the whole process of European integration.

The educational programme provided by the European College is geared to preparing students for careers in EU, national and local institutions, professional associations, the corporate world and private practice.

The first unit of the college was created in 1988 as a consortium of institutions, by the will of the institutions of the territory of Parma and the region Emilia-Romagna in order to offer students and  community a school of higher education, which promoted the knowledge of the functioning of EU institutions.

Academics
The current offer consists of an interdisciplinary academic curriculum on the process of European integration, aimed particularly at post-graduate Master students: the Advanced Diploma in European Studies (ADES). It was launched  on 27 September 2003 with the inauguration of the first academic year, by the President of European Commission, Romano Prodi [2]. In 2004 was inaugurated the current site of the college and the institute got the legal form of foundation, similarly to the one of the College of Europe of Bruges and Natolin. The goal is to train young European graduates in the fields of law, economics and politics of the European Union.

The Scientific Committee is composed  by: Jacques Delors, Romano Prodi, Ana Palacio, Étienne Davignon, Franco Frattini, Martin Bangemann, Alfonso Mattera, Cesare Azzali, Franco Mosconi, Andrea Boltho, Erik Jones.

Promotions
Since 2003, similarly to what happens at the College of Europe in Bruges and Natolin, each academic year is called "promotion". These are dedicated to prominent personalities that have contributed to the European integration.

References

 https://web.archive.org/web/20081204010912/http://www.europeancollege.it/index.php?IDL=1&IDA=2&seq=3&IDObj=22

Higher education in Italy
Educational policies and initiatives of the European Union
Parma
Universities and colleges in Emilia-Romagna
Education in Parma